Einar Hareide (24 October 1899 – 7 April 1983) was a Norwegian politician for the Christian Democratic Party, being the party's leader from 1955 to 1967.

He was elected to the Norwegian Parliament from Møre og Romsdal in 1945, and was re-elected on four occasions.

Hareide was born in Ålesund and was a member of Hareid municipality council between 1931 and 1937.

References

1899 births
1983 deaths
Christian Democratic Party (Norway) politicians
Members of the Storting
People from Hareid
20th-century Norwegian politicians
Politicians from Ålesund